is a passenger railway station located in the city of Kasukabe, Saitama, Japan, operated by the private railway operator Tōbu Railway.

Line
The station is served by the Tōbu Skytree Line, and is 31.1 kilometers from the terminus of the line at Asakusa Station.

Station layout
The station has two opposed side platforms serving two tracks, with an elevated station building above the tracks and platforms.

Platforms

Adjacent stations

History
Takesato Station opened on 20 December 1899. It was relocated to its present location in 1913, and the current station building was completed in 1967. From 17 March 2012, station numbering was introduced on all Tōbu lines, with Takesato Station becoming "TS-25".

Passenger statistics
In fiscal 2019, the station was used by an average of 15,804 passengers daily.

Surrounding area
 Takesato Housing District
Takesato Post Office

See also
 List of railway stations in Japan

References

External links

 Tobu Station information 

Railway stations in Japan opened in 1899
Tobu Skytree Line
Stations of Tobu Railway
Railway stations in Saitama Prefecture
Kasukabe, Saitama